Caesar and Cleopatra may refer to:
 Caesar and Cleopatra (play), by George Bernard Shaw	 
 Caesar and Cleopatra (film), based on the play and starring Claude Rains and Vivien Leigh
 Caesar and Cleopatra (2009 film), a 2009 film starring Christopher Plummer

See also
 Antony and Cleopatra (disambiguation)